Ceratrichia crowleyi,also known as Crowley's forest sylph, is a species of butterfly in the family Hesperiidae. It is found in Sierra Leone, Liberia, Ivory Coast and south-western Ghana. The habitat consists of wetter forests, especially near streams.

References

Butterflies described in 1925
Hesperiinae